Hem Simay (born 6 December 1987) is a footballer from Cambodia. He made his first appearance for the Cambodia national football team in 2008.

References 

1987 births
Living people
Cambodian footballers
Cambodia international footballers
Association football goalkeepers
Angkor Tiger FC players